Aryna Sabalenka defeated Linda Nosková in the final, 6–3, 7–6(7–4) to win her 11th WTA Tour singles title. She did not drop a set during the tournament. Nosková reached her first WTA Tour final after saving a match point in the first qualifying round against Anna Kalinskaya, and a further match point in the quarterfinals against Victoria Azarenka.

Ashleigh Barty was the reigning champion, but retired from professional tennis in March 2022.

Seeds

Draw

Finals

Top half

Bottom half

Qualifying

Seeds

Qualifiers

Qualifying draw

First qualifier

Second qualifier

Third qualifier

Fourth qualifier

Fifth qualifier

Sixth qualifier

References

External links
 Main draw
 Qualifying draw

Adelaide International 1
Adelaide International (tennis)
Adelaide